The Egyptian hieroglyph Emblem of the West (Gardiner no. R13 𓊿 or R14 𓋀) represents the  goddess Imentet, personification of the afterlife. It is composed of a hawk or ostrich feather. The alternate version of the symbol contains the complete figure of the hawk, for Horus, with the feather extending sideways, making it similar to the iat standard, surmounted by individual gods.
The feather is associated with the headdress worn by the Libyans.

The lower part of the hieroglyph contains the vertical form of the "folded cloth"    (S29 𓋴) .
As an ideogram, the hieroglyph represents  imnt "west" or wnmy "right".

See also
Gardiner's Sign List#R. Temple Furniture and Sacred Emblems
List of Egyptian hieroglyphs
Emblem of the East

References

Betrò, Maria Carmela.  Hieroglyphics: The Writings of Ancient Egypt, c. 1995, 1996-(English), Abbeville Press Publishers, New York, London, Paris (hardcover)
Budge.  An Egyptian Hieroglyphic Dictionary, E.A.Wallace Budge, (Dover Publications), c 1978, (c 1920), Dover edition, 1978. (In two volumes) (softcover)
Collier and Manley. How to Read Egyptian Hieroglyphs, Collier, Mark and Manley, Bill. Illustrated by Richard Parkinson. c 1998. (hardcover)

Egyptian hieroglyphs: temple furniture and emblems